A Christmas Cornucopia is the fifth studio album, and the first Christmas album, by Scottish singer-songwriter Annie Lennox, released in November 2010. It was Lennox's first album after signing to the Universal Music Group (Island Records in the UK, Decca in the US and Canada) following her departure from Sony BMG, which had been her label for almost 30 years.

The album is a collection of Lennox's favourite Christmas songs, though includes one original track written by Lennox, "Universal Child", which was released digitally as a single on 12 October 2010. A music video for Lennox's version of the classic Christmas carol "God Rest Ye Merry Gentlemen" premiered on 4 November 2010, which was released as the second digital single from the album.

A tenth anniversary special edition of the album was released on 20 November 2020 including a new recording, "Dido's Lament".

Reception

Metacritic gives A Christmas Cornucopia a weighted average score of 73 based on 9 reviews, meaning "generally favorable reviews". Ian Wade of BBC Music gave the album a very positive review, saying "this collection could find itself becoming as much a part of the holiday season as arguments with loved ones." Sal Cinquemani of Slant Magazine awarded the album 3.5/5 and said "Lennox seems more inspired on A Christmas Cornucopia than she has in years." John Hunt of Qatar Today magazine gave the album 9/10 and said "in particular, the vocal work and musical arrangement of 'God Rest Ye Merry Gentlemen' are impactful to the point of being intimidating."

Track listing

Commercial performance
As of January 2011, Christmas Cornucopia has sold 179,000 copies in United States.

Personnel
Annie Lennox – accordion, African drums, African percussion, arranger, dulcimer, Fender Rhodes, flute, harmonium, keyboards, marimba, orchestral arrangements, pan pipes, percussion, piano, pipe organ, producer, reed organ, santur, string arrangements, triangle, vibraphone, vocal percussion, vocals, whisper, whistle, Wurlitzer
Dave Robbins – conductor
Mike Stevens – arranger, bass, drones, engineer, glockenspiel, acoustic guitar, nylon string guitar, keyboards, mixing, music box, orchestral arrangements, organ, Hammond organ, oud, African drums, producer, programming, string arrangements, strings
Barry Van Zyl – African drums, percussion
The African Children's Choir – vocals
Technical
Matt Allison, Marcus Byrne - engineer
Heff Moraes - mixing, mixing consultant 
Mike Owen - photography

Charts

Weekly charts

Year-end charts

Certifications

Release history

References

Annie Lennox albums
2010 Christmas albums
Christmas albums by Scottish artists
Decca Records albums
Island Records albums